Essays on Nima Yushij: Animating Modernism in Persian Poetry is a 2004 book edited by Ahmad Karimi-Hakkak and Kamran Talattof, in which the authors examine the question of poetic modernity in She'r-e Nimaa'i.

Contents

References

External links 
Essays on Nima Yushij

2004 non-fiction books
Edited volumes
English-language books
Brill Publishers books
Works about Nima Yooshij